Corumbataí is a municipality in the state of São Paulo, Brazil.

Corumbataí may also refer to:

 Corumbataí do Sul, Paraná, Brazil
 Corumbataí River (disambiguation)

See also
 Corumbataia, a genus of armored catfishes